Cupiennius, known by the common name bromeliad spiders or as the often confused name banana spiders, is a genus of araneomorph spiders in the family Trechaleidae, named by Eugène Simon in 1891. They are found from Mexico to northwestern South America, and on some Caribbean islands. Unlike the dangerously venomous Phoneutria, bites from these spiders typically have only minor effects on humans, and have been compared to a bee sting.

The larger species are sometimes found far outside their native ranges in shipments of fruits, where they are frequently confused with Phoneutria spiders.

Description 
These spiders hide during the day then come out to hunt during the night. They usually hide in particular plants, usually in bromeliads, agaves and the banana family. They are medium to large spiders, and are usually a grey, brown or orange color. Sometimes owning a striped pattern. They have relatively longer legs then their bodies.

Retreat 
These spiders hide during the day then come out to hunt during the night. They are quite specific with their retreats. They usually hide in bromeliads, agaves and the banana family. If these leaves are exposed they would usually stick together leaves or make tunnels by bending or rolling up leaves and pasting them with silk. The inside of the retreat is usually more humid then the outside during the day, usually being at 90% humidity, as drying up is a considerable risk for them.

Hunting 
They hunt at night, venturing out of their retreats to stalk prey on leaves. They do this in what we consider total darkness. Although they have advanced eyes they primarily sense prey by detecting minute vibrations, which they may feel up to several meters away.  Vibrations are sensed by specialized organs called metatarsal lyriform organs, which are located in the metatarsus of the two front legs. These organs consist of tiny slits, which are parallel to one another, looking like a lyre. When the tarsus is moved by the vibration, they compress, which stimulates the nervous system.

Courtship 
These spiders own a very unique courtship system. Once it's time to breed the female will leave a dragline made of silk, wherever she walks to. Once the male recognizes the thread of the female, it will start sending vibrations to the plant the string was found on. Being distinct to each species. If the females replies, the male will follow the vibrations to the female.

Species
 it contains eleven species:
Cupiennius bimaculatus (Taczanowski, 1874) – Colombia, Venezuela, Brazil, Guyana, Ecuador
Cupiennius chiapanensis Medina, 2006 – Mexico
Cupiennius coccineus F. O. Pickard-Cambridge, 1901 – Costa Rica to Colombia
Cupiennius cubae Strand, 1909 – Cuba, Costa Rica to Venezuela
Cupiennius foliatus F. O. Pickard-Cambridge, 1901 – Costa Rica, Panama
Cupiennius getazi Simon, 1891 (type) – Costa Rica, Panama
Cupiennius granadensis (Keyserling, 1877) – Costa Rica to Colombia
Cupiennius remedius Barth & Cordes, 1998 – Guatemala
Cupiennius salei (Keyserling, 1877) – Mexico, Central America, Hispaniola
Cupiennius valentinei (Petrunkevitch, 1925) – Panama
Cupiennius vodou Brescovit & Polotow, 2005 – Hispaniola

References

External links
 Cupiennius getazi banana spider

Araneomorphae genera
Trechaleidae
Spiders of Central America
Spiders of Mexico
Spiders of South America
Taxa named by Eugène Simon